Glyphipterix leucocerastes is a species of sedge moth in the genus Glyphipterix. It was described by Edward Meyrick in 1880. It is found in Australia, including New South Wales.

References

Moths described in 1880
Glyphipterigidae
Moths of Australia